Anthony Sweeney (born 20 May 1938) is a British judoka. He competed in the men's heavyweight event at the 1964 Summer Olympics.

References

1938 births
Living people
British male judoka
Olympic judoka of Great Britain
Judoka at the 1964 Summer Olympics
Place of birth missing (living people)